Mostly Blues...and Some Others is a 1983 studio album by Count Basie. This was his last small-group recording and his last album of new material released before he died in 1984.

Track listing 
1. "I'll Always Be in Love with You" (Bud Green, Ruby, Sam H. Stept) – 5:57
(Note: the actual length of "I'll Always Be in Love with You" is 08:13 in spite of the official Pablo information) 
2. "Snooky" (Count Basie) – 3:42
3. "Blues for Charlie Christian" (Basie) – 5:24
4. "Jaws" (Basie) – 5:34
5. "I'm Confessin' (That I Love You)" (Doc Daugherty, Al J. Neiburg, Ellis Reynolds) – 4:29
6. "I Want a Little Girl" (Murray Mencher, Billy Moll) – 4:58
7. "Blues in C" (Louis Bellson, Benny Carter, Art Tatum) – 6:58
8. "Brio" (Basie, Joe Pass) – 4:42

Personnel 
 Count Basie - piano
 Eddie "Lockjaw" Davis - tenor saxophone
 Snooky Young - trumpet
 Freddie Green - guitar
 Joe Pass - guitar
 John Heard - double bass
 Roy McCurdy - drums
Known as  "The Kansas City Septem"

References 

1983 albums
Count Basie albums
Pablo Records albums
Albums produced by Norman Granz